Fluvidona is a genus of minute freshwater snails with an operculum, aquatic gastropod molluscs or micromolluscs in the Tateidae family. Fluvidona species are endemic to northern New South Wales and southern Queensland, Australia.

Species
The genus Fluvidona includes the following 7 species:
 Fluvidona anodonta (Hedley & Musson, 1892)
 Fluvidona dorrigoensis Miller, Ponder & Clark, 1999
 †Fluvidona dulvertonensis (Tenison-Woods, 1876)
 Fluvidona griffithsi Miller, Ponder & Clark, 1999
 Fluvidona orphana Miller, Ponder & Clark, 1999
 Fluvidona petterdi E. A. Smith, 1882
 Fluvidona simsoniana Brazier, 1875

References

 
Hydrobiidae